Walter M. Provine (1873–1955) was an Illinois lawyer.

Biography

Walter M. Provine was born in Taylorville, Illinois on November 23, 1873, the son of William Martin Provine (1841-1926) and his wife Mary (Murray) Provine (1843-1916).

After attending Cornell University, Provine was admitted to the bar of Illinois in 1897.   He returned to Taylorville, where he practiced law with his father.

He served as mayor of Taylorville from 1913 to 1915.   He was president of the Illinois State Bar Association 1918-19.  In 1924, he ran for Illinois Attorney General, losing the nomination to Oscar E. Carlstrom.  From 1926 to 1931, he was a member of the Illinois House of Representatives.

He died of a sudden heart attack in Jersey City, New Jersey on January 25, 1955.

References

1873 births
1955 deaths
Illinois lawyers
Cornell University alumni
People from Taylorville, Illinois
Mayors of places in Illinois